Potepalovo is a rural locality (a village) in Vysokovskoye Rural Settlement, Ust-Kubinsky  District, Vologda Oblast, Russia. The population was 6 as of 2002.

Geography 
Potepalovo is located 20 km southeast of Ustye (the district's administrative centre) by road. Priluki is the nearest rural locality.

References 

Rural localities in Tarnogsky District